The , referred to as , is Japanese cable railway line in Yao, Osaka, owned and operated by Kintetsu Railway. The line, opened in 1930, makes a route to Chōgo Sonshi-ji temple on Mount Shigi. However, the eastern line was closed in 1983.

Basic data
Distance: 
System: Single track with two cars
Gauge: 
Stations: 2
Vertical interval:

Stations

See also
List of funicular railways
List of railway lines in Japan

External links 
 Kintetsu official website 

Funicular railways in Japan
Rail transport in Osaka Prefecture
1067 mm gauge railways in Japan
1930 establishments in Japan